Samcheok Shinwoo Electronics FC was a South Korean football club based in the city of Samcheok.  It was established in Hwaseong in 2006 as Hwaseong Shinwoo Electronics FC.  It moved its home to Samcheok in 2008, changing its name to Samcheok Shinwoo Electronics FC.  It was a member of the Challengers League, an amateur league and the fourth tier of league football in South Korea. The club withdraw from the league at the end of the 2010 season.

Honours
K3 League
Runner-up: (2) 2007, 2008

Year-by-year

External links
  Samcheok Shinwoo Electronics FC official website

K3 League (2007–2019) clubs
C
Association football clubs established in 2006
Association football clubs disestablished in 2011
Sport in Gangwon Province, South Korea
Samcheok
2006 establishments in South Korea
2011 disestablishments in South Korea
Works association football clubs in South Korea